Songsit Roongnophakunsri (born 6 May 1967), nicknamed Kob, is a Thai singer and actor. He became known for the song "Patihan" from his 1990 album Kob Sai Sai and the sitcom Sam Num Sam Mum, which ran from 1991 to 1998. He released four original albums with GMM Grammy between 1989 and 1994, and has had acting roles in numerous television series, as well as stage musicals and films.

Filmography

Film

Television

References

External links
 
 

Songsit Roongnophakunsri
Songsit Roongnophakunsri
Songsit Roongnophakunsri
Songsit Roongnophakunsri
Songsit Roongnophakunsri
Songsit Roongnophakunsri
Songsit Roongnophakunsri
1967 births
Living people